The relationship between the Armenian genocide and the Holocaust has been discussed by scholars. While a direct causal relationship between the Armenian genocide is not proven, it has been suggested that Holocaust perpetrators were inspired by the Ottoman example and the legacy of impunity. Both the Holocaust and the Armenian genocide are considered paradigmatic cases of genocide in the twentieth century.

Causality

According to historians Dominik J. Schaller and Jürgen Zimmerer, it is a widely held belief that there is a causal connection between the Armenian genocide and the Holocaust. However, as of 2010 this has not been proven. In the 1920s, there was "a great genocide debate" in the German press which resulted in many German nationalists deciding that genocide was justified as a tactic. In his book Justifying Genocide (2016), Stefan Ihrig writes that there is "no smoking gun" to prove that the Armenian genocide inspired the Holocaust. However, based on various pieces of accumulating evidence he concludes that the Nazis were well aware of the previous genocide and, to a certain extent, inspired by it. Reviewing Ihrig's book, Armenian historian Vahagn Avedian is convinced that "there are simply too many factors which connect these two cases together".

According to Vahakn Dadrian, David Matas, Yair Auron, and other scholars the perpetrators of the Holocaust were emboldened by the failure to punish the perpetrators of the Armenian genocide. According to international law scholar M. Cherif Bassiouni, the decision not to prosecute Ottoman war criminals slowed the development of international law and made it more difficult to prosecute Nazi war criminals. In contrast, after World War II the Allies understood the danger of impunity and created the Nuremberg trials.

During a 1939 speech, Hitler was quoted as stating:  Although this version of the speech is disputed, it is almost certain that Hitler knew about the Armenian genocide since he was an avid newspaper reader and the genocide was covered widely in the press. Historians, such as Ihrig and Jersak, have emphasized that the Nazis would have concluded that genocide could be camouflaged under the guise of war and would go unpunished. According to Ihrig, "There can be no doubt that the Nazis had incorporated the Armenian genocide, its 'lessons,' tactics, and 'benefits,' into their own worldview and their view of the new racial order they were building."

Analogies drawn by contemporaries
In 1933, Austrian-Jewish writer Franz Werfel published The Forty Days of Musa Dagh, a book about Armenian resistance at Musa Dagh. The purpose of the book was not just to memorialize the atrocities which were committed against the Armenians, but to warn people about the consequences of racial hatred in general and warn them about the consequences of Nazism in particular. During the Holocaust, many Jews found parallels between their experience and the book. Israeli Holocaust scholar Yehuda Bauer points out that Werfel’s novel “connected the Armenian Genocide with the Holocaust almost physically.”

Many anti-Nazis compared the fate of Jews in Nazi Germany to the genocide of the Armenians. For example, a February 1939 Sopade report by the German resistance stated:

Ihrig suggests that there is no reason that perpetrators did not make the same connection.

Comparison

Historian Francis Nicosia writes that the Armenian genocide and the Holocaust are the two most-compared genocides in the twentieth century. For historian Robert Melson, "The Armenian Genocide and the Holocaust are the quintessential instances of total genocide in the twentieth century." , one of the German Jews who, as a young leader of the Zionist movement, feverishly negotiated with Ittihadist leaders in wartime Turkey, described the "cold-bloodedly planned extermination of over one million Armenians (kaltblutig durchdacht)" as an act of perpetration "akin to Hitler's crusade of destruction against the Jews in the 1940–1942 period".

According to Israeli historian Yehuda Bauer, 

There are many similarities with the Holocaust, on such issues as occurring during a world war, attempted destruction of an ethnoreligious community which had previously been citizens of the polity, deportation in trains as well as the role of racism and religious prejudice. Historian Hans-Lukas Kieser states, "In both cases, young imperial elites and would-be saviors of empire had traumatically witnessed the loss of power, prestige, territory, and homes. In an unstable political situation and fearing imperial and personal ruin, they succeeded in establishing a single-party regime that allowed them to implement policies of expulsion and extermination based on crazy, but calculated social Darwinist engineering." There are also differences: racial antisemitism is not equivalent to the Turkist nationalism that fueled the Armenian genocide, and unlike the Holocaust in which many Jews died in death camps, the methods used for the Armenian genocide were deportation, massacres, and starvation.

In 2010, the President of Armenia, Serzh Sargsyan, stated: "Quite often historians and journalists soundly compare Deir ez Zor with Auschwitz saying that 'Deir ez Zor is the Auschwitz of the Armenians'. I think that the chronology forces us to formulate the facts in a reverse way: 'Auschwitz is the Deir ez Zor of the Jews'.

The comparison with the Holocaust is strongly rejected in many works denying the Armenian genocide, which try to appeal to a Jewish audience by "emphasizing the uniqueness and absolute difference between, on the one hand, what was indeed a real, horrific genocide and, on the other, what they call the hoax of a politically motivated Armenian claim of genocide", according to historian Richard Hovannisian.

Comparing the aftermath of the two cases, Vahagn Avedian points out how the Armenian Genocide and the Holocaust are intertwined, not only in regard to the impacted they have had on their respective affected nations (perpetrators and victims), but also how their memories have affected each other. The Armenian case have had an evident impact on both the perpetrating German elite during World War II as well as its legal aftermath, when the United Nations War Crimes Commission in its 1948 report used the Armenian massacres as an example of Crimes Against Humanity and thereby a precedent for the Nuremberg Charter's Article 6 as the basis for the impending review of the UN Genocide Convention.  In turn, the Holocaust has been present in almost every aspect of the recognition process of the Armenian Genocide, invoked by both camps when advocating for a wider political recognition aligned with the scholarly consensus as well as its denial. The process of the politics of memory of each case has, although quite diametrically, had a significant role in shaping post WWI Turkey's and post-WWII Germany's national identity and narrative respectively, the former based on denial and history revisionism while the latter has chosen recognition of the wrongdoing and its consequences.

Denial
While Armenian genocide denial is an official policy of the Turkish state, Germany acknowledged the Holocaust and paid reparations for it. Holocaust denial is therefore a much more marginal phenomenon.

In Perinçek v. Switzerland (2015), the European Court of Human Rights determined that Armenian genocide denial falls within the right to freedom of speech guaranteed in Article 10 of the European Convention on Human Rights, whereas member states are permitted to criminalize Holocaust denial. Law professor Uladzislau Belavusau criticized this decision for "creat[ing] a speculative distinction between the Holocaust and other 20th-century atrocities" that amounted to trivialization of the Armenian genocide.

In October 2020, Facebook banned Holocaust denial from its platform, but continued to allow denial of the Armenian genocide. It did not offer any reason for this different treatment. Former world chess champion Garry Kasparov, himself of mixed Armenian-Jewish ancestry, criticized Facebook founder Mark Zuckerberg after his Facebook page was shut down after posting an interview, which mentioned the Armenian genocide. "So Holocaust denial is now banned on FB, according to Zuckerberg, but those who deny the Armenian Genocide are very welcome on Facebook—and even rewarded by having their targets' pages blocked," said Kasparov. Armenian diaspora and anti-hate groups, such as the AGBU, Anti-Defamation League (ADL), and Genocide Watch, have called on Facebook to ban Armenian genocide denial on its platform.

See also
 Armenian–Jewish relations
 Hitler's Armenian reference
 Link between the Herero genocide and the Holocaust

References

Bibliography

Further reading
 
 
 
 
 

 

 

Aftermath of the Armenian genocide
The Holocaust